= Campaign Series Grid Sheets =

Supplement for miniature games

Campaign Series Grid Sheets is a 1980 miniatures game supplement published by Indicia Associates.

== Plot summary ==
Campaign Series Grid Sheets are two 36" x 50" sheets, with one sheet consisting of one-inch squares on one side, and the other sheet has hex grids on both sides (16mm scale on one side, with 19mm scale on the other) for drawing maps of any kind directly on the paper or on a plastic overlay that was available for separate purchase.

== Reception ==
Elisabeth Barrington reviewed Campaign Series Grid Sheets in The Space Gamer No. 35. Barrington commented that "Recommended to gamers of any system using either of these grid types."
